The Channel One Trophy, or the Channel One Cup, is a Russian domestic team figure skating competition organized by the Russian Figure Skating Federation and the Channel One television channel.

Skaters compete against each other in two teams.

The inaugural edition was held from 5 to 7 February 2021 in Moscow. The second edition was held from 24 to 27 March 2022 in Saransk.

Editions

References

Figure skating in Russia